Southeast High School, South East High School, or Southeastern High School may refer to:

California 
 South East High School (South Gate, California)

Florida 
 Southeast High School (Florida) in Bradenton

Illinois 
 Southeastern High School (Illinois)
 Springfield Southeast High School

Kansas 
 South East High School (Kansas) in Cherokee, Kansas
 Southeast of Saline Secondary School in Gypsum
 Wichita High School Southeast

Michigan 
 Southeastern High School (Detroit, Michigan)

Missouri 
 Southeast High School (Missouri) in Kansas City, Missouri

Nebraska 
 Lincoln Southeast High School

Ohio 
 Southeast High School (Ohio) in Palmyra Township
 Southeastern High School (Chillicothe, Ohio)
 Southeastern Local High School (South Charleston, Ohio)

Oklahoma 
 Southeast High School (Oklahoma City, Oklahoma)